Albert Weisbogel (1844 – May 27, 1919) was a 19th-century United States Navy sailor. He was twice awarded America's highest military decoration, the Medal of Honor, for peacetime actions (for which he would now be awarded the Navy and Marine Corps Medal). He is one of only 19 people to be awarded two Medals of Honor, and one of only 14 to be awarded the Medal twice for two separate actions.

Biography
Weisbogel was born in 1844 in New Orleans, Louisiana. On that day, one of his shipmates, a U.S. Marine named Wolf, jumped overboard in a "fit of insanity" in an attempt to commit suicide by drowning. Weisbogel jumped in after and saved him. For this action, he was awarded a Medal of Honor two years later, on March 23, 1876.

Barely a month after being awarded his first Medal of Honor, on April 27, 1876, he again saved a crewmate from drowning. While Plymouth, under the command of Captain Edward Barrett, who proposed his second Medal of Honor, was entering the harbor of Kingston, Jamaica, Landsman Peter J. Kenny fell overboard and was rescued by Weisbogel. For that action he was awarded his second Medal of Honor, on June 9, 1876.

Weisbogel died at age 74 or 75 and was buried in Holy Cross Cemetery in Brooklyn, New York: diamond section, range D, grave 132.

Medal of Honor citations
Weisbogel's official Medal of Honor citations are as follows:

First Award
For gallant conduct in jumping overboard from the U.S.S. Benicia, at sea, and rescuing from drowning one of the crew of that vessel on 11 January 1874.

Second Award
For gallant conduct in jumping overboard from the U.S.S. Plymouth, at sea, and rescuing from drowning one of the crew of that vessel on 27 April 1876.

See also

List of Medal of Honor recipients during Peacetime

References

1844 births
1919 deaths
People from New Orleans
United States Navy sailors
United States Navy Medal of Honor recipients
Non-combat recipients of the Medal of Honor
Double Recipients of the Medal of Honor